"In My Defence" is a song performed by Queen lead vocalist Freddie Mercury. It was from the 1986 musical Time by Dave Clark and featured on the Time concept album. The song was not a hit during Mercury's lifetime but was released posthumously in November 1992, reaching number eight on the UK Singles Chart.

Background
The song was written by Dave Clark, David Soames and Jeff Daniels for the musical Time. During the musical, Mercury performed the song as a duet with Cliff Richard; this was the last time Mercury sang live in concert; his last performance would be Barcelona in 1988 with Montserrat Caballé, but that performance was lip-synced. Recorded as a solo project, it was recorded at Abbey Road in October 1985, about six months after Mr. Bad Guy was released. The producers expected that if Mercury was not satisfied with the final song, they would let him record with the rest of Queen, but Mercury found the final version satisfactory. "In My Defence" was first released on the Time LP in 1986. Other versions include '(Ron Nevison Mix)' - released on The Freddie Mercury Album and instrumental version (with vocals for the last line) released also on The Solo Collection. The Ron Nevison mix is very similar to the original, but has different bass and drums, while some string parts were added and others were removed. The 2000 Remix is a remastered version of the Ron Nevison mix and has the same instrumentation mixed differently.

Music video
The music video, made after Mercury's death in 1991, was directed by Rudi Dolezal and was a montage featuring outtakes of past music videos, numerous private shots, as well as highlights of Mercury's career. Dolezal wanted the video that showed Mercury being happy and having a good time; much of the footage is the same as the previous "The Show Must Go On" montage also compiled by DoRo Productions consisting of Dolezal and Hannes Rossacher. It also features several quotations from interviews with Mercury, and ends with the line "I still love you" from "These Are the Days of Our Lives".

Track listings
UK 7-inch and cassette
A. In My Defence
B. Love Kills (Wolf Euro mix)

UK CD1
 In My Defence
 Love Kills (Wolf Euro mix)
 She Blows Hot and Cold (single version)
 In My Defence (original version)

UK CD2
 In My Defence
 Love Kills (Original Wolf mix)
 Mr. Bad Guy
 Living On My Own (Underground Solutions mix)

Personnel
 Freddie Mercury – lead vocals
 Michael Moran – piano
 Paul Vincent – guitars
 Graham Jarvis – drums
 Andy Pask – bass
 Peter Banks – synthesizers
 John Christie – backing vocals

Charts

Weekly charts

Year-end charts

References

1985 songs
1992 singles
EMI Records singles
Freddie Mercury songs
Queen (band)
Songs from musicals
Songs written by Dave Clark (musician)